The Tallahassee Tempest were an American soccer team that played in Tallahassee, Florida.

Year-by-year

Defunct soccer clubs in Florida
USL Second Division teams
1998 establishments in Florida
Association football clubs established in 1998
1998 disestablishments in Florida
Association football clubs disestablished in 1998
Sports in Tallahassee, Florida
Soccer clubs in Florida